Pranotosh Kumar Das is a retired Bangladeshi footballer who plays as a midfielder. He laste played for Dhaka Abahani. He scored his first international goal against Bhutan during 2009 SAFF Championship.

References

Living people
1982 births
Abahani Limited (Dhaka) players
Arambagh KS players
Brothers Union players
Bangladeshi footballers
Bangladesh international footballers
Association football midfielders
People from Bagerhat District
Bangladeshi Hindus